Naan Ungal Thozhan is a 1978 Sri Lankan Tamil-language film directed by S. V. Chandran. The film stars V. P. Ganesan, Subashini, T.S. Loganathan and S. Ramdass.

Plot
Kannan (V. P. Ganesan) is the doctor in a village hospital. A village girl, Radha (Subashini), likes Kannan and indicates her love to Kannan. But Kannan does not accept. Rajan (Lathief) is a rich young man and the son of the village landlord (Jawahar). He loves Radha. When he learns that Radha loves Kannan, he wants to take revenge on Kannan. One day Radha takes refuge in Kannan's hospital to escape from Rajan. She takes a medicine mistaking it for water. She gets fainted. Rajan comes and molests her. People think it was Kannan who molested Radha. However, Rajan confesses and all ends well.

Cast
The list was compiled from a review published in ourjaffna.com

Male cast
V. P. Ganesan
S. Ramdass
M. M. A. Lathief
K. A. Jawahar
T.S.Loganathan
M. R. Kalaichelvan
S. N. Thanaratnam
Vimal Sokkanathan
Haridas

Female cast
Subashini
Rukmani Devi
Jenita
Chandrakala
Jayadevi

Production
The film was produced by V. P. Ganesan under his own banner Ganesh Films and was directed by S. V. Chandran who also edited the film. Screenplay and dialogues were penned by Kalaichelvan. Vamadevan handled the cinematography.

V. P. Ganesan, who was also a trade unionist in Sri Lanka, is the only one who produced 3 Tamil films in Sri Lanka. Shooting was done in several locations in Colombo, Jaffna, Batticaloa, Trincomallee and Kandy.

Soundtrack
Music was composed by M. K. Rocksamy and the lyrics were penned by Shanthi, Murugaverl and Sadhu. Playback singers are K. S. Balachandran, Mohideen Baig, V. Muthazhagu, Kalavathi and Kanagambal.

References

1978 films
1970s Tamil-language films
Sri Lankan Tamil-language films